Digha Heliport is located at Digha, West Bengal, India. Chief Minister Mamata Banerjee inaugurated the new facility on 23 December 2015. The heliport's commercial service started on 26 December 2015.

The heliport, owned by the Government of West Bengal, is the first of its kind in the country. The heliport is spread over 25 acres, a few kilometres away from the Digha sea-beach. The flights are only operated on Sundays and take roughly 40 to 45 minutes.

Destination and Airlines

References

Transport in Digha
Heliports in India
Transport in West Bengal